The 2001–02 season was Fulham F.C.'s 104th season of professional football and their first season in the Premier League. They were managed by Jean Tigana, who had also overseen their promotion from the First Division the previous season.

Season summary
After the high-profile signings of Juventus goalkeeper Edwin van der Sar and Lyon striker Steve Marlet, amongst others, Fulham chairman Mohammed Al-Fayed boasted that the newly promoted side would win the Premiership title. As it was, Fulham never came anywhere near matching the pace set by the likes of Arsenal, Liverpool and Manchester United, but the Cottagers still impressed upon their return to the top flight, peaking as high as eighth at one point. The club's good form gave hope to fans that their team could challenge for European qualification either through the league or their FA Cup run, but a run of nine games without a win dragged the club down to 16th with four games left to play and four points between them and 18th-placed Ipswich. Seven points from the club's last four games lifted Fulham to safety in 13th, and, despite the poor league form and elimination from the FA Cup in the semi-finals, Fulham managed to achieve European qualification via the Intertoto Cup.

Final league table

Results
Fulham's score comes first

Legend

FA Premier League

FA Cup

League Cup

Players

First-team squad
Squad at end of season

Left club during season

Reserve squad

Notes:

Transfers

In

 
 Luís Boa Morte - Southampton
 Matt Clarke - Bradford City (loan)

Out
 Terry Phelan - Sheffield United
 Paul Peschisolido - Sheffield United
 Simon Morgan - Brighton and Hove Albion
 Wayne Collins - Crewe Alexandra
 Karl-Heinz Riedle - Retired
 James Bittner
 Jacopo Galbiati

Player statistics

Appearances and goals

|-
! colspan=14 style=background:#dcdcdc; text-align:center| Goalkeepers

|-
! colspan=14 style=background:#dcdcdc; text-align:center| Defenders

|-
! colspan=14 style=background:#dcdcdc; text-align:center| Midfielders

|-
! colspan=14 style=background:#dcdcdc; text-align:center| Forwards

|-
! colspan=14 style=background:#dcdcdc; text-align:center| Players transferred out during the season

Club

Management

Other information

References

Fulham F.C. seasons
Fulham